Dulcy may refer to:

A short form of Dulcinea
Dulcy (play) by George S. Kaufman and Marc Connelly, upon which the subsequent films were based.
Dulcy (1923 film)
Dulcy (1940 film)
Dulcy the Dragon, a dragon in Sonic the Hedgehog